A Slave to Drink is a 1909 American silent film produced by Kalem Company and directed by Sidney Olcott.

Production notes
The film was shot in Jacksonville, Florida.

References
 The Moving Picture World, Vol 5, p 971, p 978, Vol 6, p 56
 The New York Dramatic Mirror, January 8, 1910, p 18

External links
 AFI Catalog
 
 A Slave to Drink website dedicated to Sidney Olcott

1909 films
1909 drama films
1909 short films
American black-and-white films
American silent short films
Films directed by Sidney Olcott
Films set in Florida
Films shot in Jacksonville, Florida
Silent American drama films
1900s American films
1900s English-language films